Raihau Maiau (born 1 August 1992 in Moorea-Maiao) is a French Polynesian-born athlete competing internationally for France in the long jump. He won the gold medal at the 2017 Jeux de la Francophonie and the bronze at the 2017 Summer Universiade.

International competitions

Personal bests

Outdoor
100 metres – 10.58 (+0.7 m/s, Toulouse 2014)
Long jump – 7.98 (+1.7 m/s, Marseille 2015)

Indoor
60 metres – 6.72 (Nantes 2016)
Long jump – 8.02 (Nantes 2016)

References

1992 births
Living people
French Polynesian male athletes
French male long jumpers
Universiade medalists in athletics (track and field)
Universiade bronze medalists for France
Medalists at the 2017 Summer Universiade
French Polynesian long jumpers
People from Mo'orea